Ungava Bay (/) is a bay in northeastern Canada separating Nunavik (far northern Quebec) from Baffin Island. Although not geographically apparent, it is considered to be a marginal sea of the Arctic Ocean for climatic reasons. It is generally fairly shallow, under , though at its border with the Atlantic Ocean depths of almost  are reached.

Geography
Although it is quite close to the open Atlantic (separated only by Hudson Strait), Ungava Bay is part of the Arctic Ocean. Ungava Bay is separated from Hudson Bay by the Ungava Peninsula. Akpatok Island is largest of the many islands in Ungava Bay.

The southwestern corner of Ungava Bay vies with the Bay of Fundy for the highest tidal range in the world. Attempts have been made to study the potential for producing electricity using tidal power in the bay, but this is made difficult by the harsh climate and the fact that the bay is ice-free for only a small part of the year.

Climate
Due to the influence of the Labrador Current, summers are too cold for tree growth and all the land surrounding the bay is treeless tundra.

Human development
Ungava Bay is surrounded by numerous Inuit villages, the largest of which is Kuujjuaq, Quebec, at the mouth of the Koksoak River. Iron ore has been mined in the past, but despite the high grade of the ores the impossibility of cheap transportation meant that mining was discontinued in 1980. Traditional Inuit hunting activities still dominate the region's life, along with adventure tourism.

References

External links 

Across Arctic Ungava (1949). An online documentary from the National Film Board of Canada.

Bays of Quebec
Bays of Qikiqtaaluk Region
Landforms of Nord-du-Québec